Luka Nicola Tudor Bakulic (born Lukas Nicolás Tudor Bakulic; 21 February 1969) is a former Chilean footballer who played as a forward.

Career
He played for the U-20 side at both the 1987 South American Championship and the 1987 FIFA World Youth Championship in Chile and was a member of the senior squad at the 1989 Copa América. 

He holds the Chilean record for most goals scored in one game: playing for CD Universidad Católica, in November 1993 he netted seven times in the 8–3 win over CD Antofagasta.

Personal life
His son, Milan, is a footballer from the Universidad Católica youth ranks and has taken part of Chile national team at under-17 level.

After his retirement, he has mainly worked as a football commentator and analyst in radio and TV media such as ADN Radio Chile, Canal del Fútbol and ESPN Chile.

In addition, in 2000 he performed as a TV host for the program Bohemia from Chilevisión.

Honours
FC Sion
 Swiss Cup (1): 1990–91

Newell's Old Boys
 Argentine Primera División (1): 1992 Clausura

Universidad Católica
 Copa Chile (1): 1995
 Copa Interamericana (1): 1993

Colo-Colo
 Chilean Primera División (1): 1997 Clausura

Chile
  (1):

References

External links

Luka Tudor at PlaymakerStats
Luka Tudor at PartidosdeLaRoja 
Luka Tudor at HistoriadeColoColo 

1969 births
Living people
Chilean people of Croatian descent
Footballers from Santiago
Chilean footballers
Chilean expatriate footballers
Chile under-20 international footballers
Chile international footballers
1989 Copa América players
Club Deportivo Universidad Católica footballers
FC Sion players
Newell's Old Boys footballers
CE Sabadell FC footballers
Colo-Colo footballers
Chilean Primera División players
Swiss Super League players
Argentine Primera División players
Segunda División players
Chilean expatriate sportspeople in Switzerland
Chilean expatriate sportspeople in Argentina
Chilean expatriate sportspeople in Spain
Expatriate footballers in Switzerland
Expatriate footballers in Argentina
Expatriate footballers in Spain
Association football forwards
Canal del Fútbol color commentators
Chilean association football commentators
Chilean radio presenters